In 1956, 240 Jain bronze idols were discovered dating back to early medieval to medieval period. The Vasantgarh hoard, thus named after the place of discovery, Vasantgarh is located in the Sirohi District of Rajasthan, India.

Description 
In 1956, 240 bronze idols were discovered dating back to early medieval to medieval period. The vast number of idols found in Vasantgarh is the evidence of strong foothold Jainism had a in the area. Vasantgarh hoard along with Akota bronzes and devni-mori (Idar) are important bronze hoards found in Gujarat and Kathiawar province.

The Akota and Vasantgarh were predominately influenced by Gupta and Gandhara style. It is indicated by the idols that it is influenced by more styles like styles during reign of Harsha and maitraka of Valabhi. Idols of this hoard show images of tirthankar, sashandevatas (yaksha and yakshi) and Jain deities in Shwetambar iconography. The images found in this hoard is small in size and were cast by the cire-perdue (lost-wax casting) process, and the eyes and ornaments are frequently inlaid with silver and gold.

Major images 
The idol of Goddess Saraswati along with an ornate crown standing on a lotus pedestal with a lotus stem in one hand and manuscript in the other. This idol found in the hoard resembling the iconography of Saraswati found akota bronzes. The idol has now been placed inside Mahavir temple of Pindwara and worshipped as Chakreshvari. Two beautiful idol of Rishabhanatha dating back to 6th and 7th century AD. A sat-tirthika, dates to 998 AD, bronze image of parshvanatha with sarvanha and ambika devi. The chaturvimsatipatta of adinatha and tritirthi Parshvanatha built-in Vasantgarh style dating back to 1066 and 1078 respectively are noteworthy.

See also 
 Hansi hoard
 Aluara bronzes

References

Citation

Source 

 
  
  
 
 
 
  
  
  

Jain sculptures
Treasure troves of India